Apolônio Morais da Paixão Neto (born 19 June 1982 in Salvador, Bahia), known as just Neto, is a Brazilian footballer who plays for Brasil de Pelotas.

He has the same given name along with his grandfather, thus has a suffix Neto (means grandson) in his name.

External links
http://www.cbf.com.br/php/registro.php?i=148360

1982 births
Living people
Brazilian footballers
Brazilian expatriate sportspeople in Hong Kong
Expatriate footballers in Hong Kong
Association football midfielders
Sportspeople from Salvador, Bahia